C17, C-17 or C.17 may refer to:

Transportation
 , a 1917 British C-class submarine

Air
 Boeing C-17 Globemaster III, a military transport aircraft
 Lockheed Y1C-17 Vega, a six-passenger monoplane
 Cierva C.17, a 1928 English experimental autogyro

Land
 C-17 highway (Spain) also known as Eix del Congost, a primary highway in Catalonia
 Queensland C17 class locomotive
 Sauber C17, a 1998 Formula One car

Science and technology
 C17 (C standard revision), an informal name for ISO/IEC 9899:2018, the most recent standard for the C programming language
 C17, a female two-pole IEC 60320 electrical cable connector that mates with a male C18 appliance inlet
 Caldwell 17, a dwarf spheroidal galaxy of the Local Group in the constellation Cassiopeia
 Carbon-17 (C-17 or 17C), an isotope of carbon
 C17, a 17-Carbon molecule in chlorophyll metabolism
 Precorrin-3B C17-methyltransferase, an enzyme involved in that metabolism
 Small intestine cancer (ICD-10 code)

Other uses
 City 17, a fictional location in the Half-Life universe
 French Defence (Encyclopaedia of Chess Openings code)
 17th century
 Android 17, character from Dragon Ball Franchise

See also

 C++17 (programming language) a standard codified in 2017, part of ISO/IEC 14882 
 
 17 (disambiguation)

 Class 17 (disambiguation)